Filippo De Col (born 28 October 1993) is an Italian footballer who plays as a right defender for  club Südtirol.

Career
De Col started his professional career at Milan, leaving the club in 2011, signing with Legnago Salus. After an outstanding season in Serie D, he then signed with Virtus Entella in July 2012.

On 1 July 2013 De Col signed with Serie A-bound Verona, being immediately loaned to Virtus Lanciano, in Serie B.

De Col and colleague Claudio Terzi were involved in a WhatsApp match-fixing scandal along with Emanuele Calaiò at the end of the 2017–18 season.

On 2 September 2019, his contract with Spezia was dissolved by mutual consent.

On 23 January 2020, he returned to Virtus Entella, signing a contract until the end of the 2019–20 season with an extension option.

On 17 June 2021, he joined Südtirol on a two-year contract.

References

External links

1993 births
Living people
Sportspeople from the Province of Belluno
Footballers from Veneto
Italian footballers
Association football defenders
Serie B players
Serie C players
Serie D players
F.C. Legnago Salus players
Virtus Entella players
Hellas Verona F.C. players
S.S. Virtus Lanciano 1924 players
Spezia Calcio players
A.C. Cesena players
F.C. Südtirol players
Italy youth international footballers
Italy under-21 international footballers